This is a list of notable tornadoes, tornado outbreaks, and tornado outbreak sequences that have occurred in Canada in the 21st century. (2001 through 2100). Due to increasing detection, particularly in the US and southern Canada, numbers of counted tornadoes have increased markedly in recent decades although number of actual tornadoes and counted significant tornadoes has not. In older events, the number of tornadoes officially counted is likely underestimated.

On average, there are around 80 confirmed and unconfirmed tornadoes that touch down in Canada each year, with most occurring in the southern Canadian Prairies, Southern Ontario and southern Quebec. Canada ranks as the second country in the world with the most tornadoes per year, after the US. The most common types are F0 to F2 in damage intensity level and usually result in minor structural damage to barns, wood fences, roof shingles, chimneys, uprooted or snapped tree limbs and downed power lines. Prior to April 1, 2013, Canada used a slightly modified Fujita scale, and as of that date the Enhanced Fujita scale, again slightly modified, was put into use to rate tornado intensity, based on the damage to buildings and vegetation.

Each year on average, about 43 tornadoes occur across the Canadian Prairies and about 17 occur across Ontario and Quebec. New Brunswick and the British Columbia Interior are also recognized tornado zones. All other provinces and territories have significantly less threat from tornadoes. The peak season in Canada is through the summer months, (June to August), when clashing air masses move north, as opposed to the spring season in the United States southern-central plains, although tornadoes in Canada have occurred in spring, fall and very rarely winter.

The reported increase in numbers of tornadoes in recent years may reflect more reporting by citizens and media involvement rather than an actual increase in tornado occurrence (although some natural increase has not been ruled out), in addition to better detection technology i.e. Doppler weather radar and satellite imagery. The upswing could also be attributed to other factors, such as improved aerial and ground damage assessment after the fact in sparsely populated areas (particularly the case in remote parts of the Canadian Prairies and Northern Ontario, for example), better trained spotter capabilities and increased use of digital recording devices by citizens. The Northern Tornadoes Project attempts to gather more systematic data on tornado prevelance. Tornadoes in Canada are enough of a threat for a public warning system to be in place, overseen by the national weather agency, Environment Canada (EC).

For a variety of reasons, such as Canada's lower population density and generally stronger housing construction due to the colder climate, Canadian tornadoes have historically caused far fewer fatalities than tornadoes in the United States. The deadliest tornado in Canadian history, the Regina Cyclone of June 30, 1912, does not even rank in the top 25 when compared to American tornado fatalities. Urban centres are not immune from the threat of severe tornadoes. Eleven medium to large size Canadian cities have been hit by significant strength tornadoes (F3/EF3 or higher), which caused large-scale damage and fatalities: Toronto (1868); Regina (1912); Windsor (1946 and 1974); Sarnia (1953); Sudbury (1970); Woodstock (1979); Lloydminster  (1983); Barrie (1985); Edmonton (1987); Aylmer (1994); and Ottawa-Gatineau (2018).

All figures for damages are in Canadian dollars.

2000s

2001
June 19 – two tornadoes touched down in the Saguenay–Lac-Saint-Jean region of Quebec. An F2 struck near Alma, lasting about half a minute and destroying two houses, a barn and a garage. The second tornado, an F0, was confirmed in the same region near Pointe-Taillon National Park.
July 1 – an F1 tornado was confirmed near Lac Saint-Jean, Quebec. It tore the roof from a house and knocked out power to several communities.
July 4 – four tornadoes touched down in Southern Ontario causing minor damage. Three were given an F0 rating, and were confirmed near the towns of Argyle, Campbellville and Ayr. The fourth was rated as an F1 and touched down in the Fenelon Falls area knocking over a silo. Two other tornadoes were reported, but not confirmed, near the towns of Arthur and Bancroft. No injuries were reported.
July 4 – two F1 tornadoes were confirmed near the communities of Lac-des-Plages and Brébeuf, Quebec. No significant damage was reported.
July 10 – an F0 tornado was confirmed near Saguenay, Quebec.
July 13 – a tornado was spotted near Caroline, Alberta north of Calgary.
August 4 – an F1 tornado touched down in Matagami, Quebec.
August 9 – an F1 tornado was confirmed near Alma, Quebec.

2002
 May 31 – North Bay, Ontario was struck by two weak tornadoes.
 June 23 – a weak tornado touched down in Ottawa between Kanata and Barrhaven.
 July 28 – severe thunderstorms over Northern Ontario produced a tornado over Halfway Lake Provincial Park ( north of Sudbury) where 800 people were camping at the time, fallen trees injure 4 campers. Up to  rain falls in just 3 hours at Stratford and Tavistock.

2003
 June 11 – Laval, Quebec was struck by an F1 tornado that damaged trees, and many warehouses in the industrial park just north of Autoroute 440. It also caused some vehicles to go off the road as it crossed west to east both lanes of Autoroute 15 during rush hour.
 July 2 – a tornado touches down on an area of Narrow Hills Provincial Park northwest of Nipawin, Saskatchewan. It destroyed several residential trailers, turned over a tractor-trailer unit, and caused a number of injuries; the storm also dropped baseball-sized hail that is typical of tornado-producing thunderstorms in the Prairies.
 July 4 – an F1 tornado struck the communities of Saint-Jacques, New Brunswick, Moulin-Morneault, Saint-Joseph-de-Madawaska, and Deuxieme-Sault. Uprooted trees, damaged homes and businesses. Site inspected by a Meteorological Service of Canada (MSC) forecaster.
 July 8 – an F0 touches down near Sainte-Jeanne-d'Arc, Quebec in the Saguenay–Lac-Saint-Jean region. Several buildings and trees were damaged.
 July 11 – a tornado touches down near Westlock County, Alberta, north of Edmonton.
 July 14 - a tornado struck Gretna, Manitoba, leveling crops, blowing down sheds and garages and knocking down hydro poles. Trees up to a metre in diameter were struck down by the tornado.
 August 13 – a tornado touches down on a golf course and lake resort west of Edmonton in Wabamun, Alberta causing some injuries.

2004
 May 22 – May 2004 tornado outbreak sequence, one strong F2 struck near Mitchell, Ontario at 6 pm EDT (UTC−04:00) and an F3 in nearby Gad's Hill, causing extensive property and infrastructure damage.
 June 9 – an F1 struck near Escott, Ontario, destroying a barn and a two-car garage. One man was killed when a tree fell on the porch he was standing on.
 June 13 – a large tornado touches down near Vulcan, Alberta.
 July 8 – an F2 tornado touched down in Grande Prairie, Alberta, causing damage to homes and businesses, and flipping over vehicles.
 July 11 – a tornado briefly touched down in Andrew, Alberta, northeast of Edmonton.
 July 31 – four confirmed tornadoes touched down in southern Quebec.
 August 10 – two F1 tornadoes occurred near the Ottawa, Ontario region. It ripped the roof off a barn, snapped several trees and destroyed a shed. The second tornado happened near Thurso.

2005
 May 23 – a tornado touches down in and around Nipawin, Saskatchewan.
June 4 – several cold-core funnel clouds were spotted in Central and Southern Alberta. Four of which briefly touched the ground. Several trees were damaged.
 June 21 – A severe thunderstorm spawned one tornado near Lethbridge, Alberta. Several funnel clouds and golf ball size hail was reported from Lethbridge to Taber.
 September 30 - a F2 tornado touched down in Havre-aux-Maisons, Quebec.
 August 19 – Southern Ontario tornado outbreak of 2005. These associated storms caused extensive widespread damage in a path from Stratford ( west of Kitchener), to Peterborough, and along Georgian Bay near Collingwood. A storm cell just to the north of Fergus spawned two F2 strength tornadoes that were particularly damaging, tearing apart trees, farms and overturning automobiles driving on a highway. The first tornado tracked through Milverton to Conestogo Lake (west of Elmira). The second moved from Salem to Lake Bellwood (north of Guelph). An unusual tornado possibly touched down within the Toronto city limits, although never officially confirmed by Environment Canada. In its wake, the storm left a trail of damage that, according to the Insurance Bureau of Canada, represented the highest insured loss in the province's history, exceeding $500 million. That's more than two and a half times Ontario's losses during the infamous ice storm of 1998 and the second largest loss event in Canadian history.
 November 9 – Hamilton, Ontario, a late-season tornado tears off part of the roof of a school and damages businesses and homes in the area. See Hamilton, Ontario tornado of 2005.

2006
A great deal of forest and structural damage, but no injuries or deaths.
 July 14 – a tornado touches down near Gretna, Manitoba, flattening crops, damaging equipment sheds, and tore up trees and power lines.
 July 17 – an F1, or possibly a weak F2, hit a La Baie du Diable campground in Ferme-Neuve, Quebec moving RVs and breaking trees.
 July 25 – an F0 tornado destroyed a barn in Lac Saint-Jean, Quebec. The same storm produced hail that reached  in diameter and caused $2 million damage in the agricultural community.
 August 1 – an F2 tornado struck the community of Lac-Drolet, Quebec in the Estrie region, destroying a house.
 August 2 – a number of homes and cottages damaged or completely destroyed by a tornado in Combermere, Ontario located in the upper Ottawa Valley. The same storm system spawned an outbreak of fourteen confirmed tornadoes mostly concentrated north of Peterborough in the Haliburton, Kawartha and Madawaska areas, which damaged cottages in the area, some severely. It was the most tornadoes confirmed in Ontario in a single 24-hour span day since 1985 and matched the annual provincial average. The strongest were two F2s, one that struck an isolated area near Bancroft and the other that made a direct hit on the town of Combermere.
 August 5 – in Gull Lake, Manitoba an F2 tornado killed a woman at a campground north of Winnipeg.
 August 15 -an F1 tornado  impacted the area of Pokemouche and Evangeline, New Brunswick. Hail, damaging winds and intense lightning were reported in the region. The tornado estimated in the lower F1 range (wind estimated around ) caused structural damage to a few properties and uprooted/snapped a few trees along the corridor. The sighting of the actual funnel cloud / tornado was reported by a few members of the public. Ended at 
 August 20 – two tornadoes touched down in Manitoba, including an F2 tornado that hit the community of La Broquerie, Manitoba, destroying a house.
 August 24 – two tornadoes touch down near Unity and Yorkton, Saskatchewan.

2007
It was the third significant tornado to hit the Mitchell area in a three-year span. The same storm system that caused this tornado also produced two other tornadoes (an F0 and an F1) in The Thumb area of Michigan, northern Indiana, and Ohio before crossing Lake Huron into Ontario.
 June 22–23 –  A rare combination of weather systems converged on a June weekend causing severe thunderstorms which spawned at least eight tornadoes across southeast Saskatchewan and southern Manitoba. The most significant, and the first confirmed F5 tornado in Canada which touched down near Elie destroying four homes, sweeping away two (one of which was heavily anchored to its foundation), flipping one home-owner's Chrysler Fifth Avenue onto a neighbour's roof, and heavily damaging a flour mill. The F5 Elie tornado was described "as bad as they ever get here in Canada" by meteorologist Dave Carlsen of Environment Canada, while he told Canwest Global affiliate CKND-TV. A large F3 wedge tornado also touched down near Pipestone and Baldur. Two tornadoes at Lampman and Carnduff, Saskatchewan reported property damage and one injury, Surprisingly there were a minimal amount of reported injuries resulting from all of the tornadoes. There were also sightings of three small tornadoes becoming one. A total of eight confirmed tornadoes over the two day span.
 June 25 – a small tornado touches down near Standard, Alberta, destroying a barn and electrocuting a horse.
 June 26 – Environment Canada confirmed a tornado struck the Petitcodiac, New Brunswick in the Salisbury area. The storm knocked down trees and hurled pieces of playground equipment and wheelbarrows long distances. In one incident, the twister picked up a trampoline from a front lawn and threw it  into a pasture.
 July 8 – an F1 tornado was confirmed near Mildmay, Ontario. Another tornado was sighted in the area but was unconfirmed.
 July 23 – after a day of  heat in the Edmonton area, a downward draft from the overhead jet stream formed a high-precipitation (HP) supercell, resulting in a tornado over Edmonton International Airport in Leduc County just before sundown. Despite its large appearance, no major damage or injuries were reported, although power was out for a few hours in the vicinity and lightning ignited a range fire west of the airport.
 July 29 –  an F0 tornado touched down near Gander Bay, Newfoundland and Labrador. The twister flipped a few snowmobile trailers over before dissipating. One of very few to strike the province.
 July 31 – a suspected tornado flattens fields and demolishes a farm yard near Cupar, Saskatchewan north of Regina.
 August 3 – an F2 tornado touched down in White Rapids, New Brunswick. The destruction of several farm buildings coupled with the cyclone signature that was recognized on the Doppler radar led officials to confirm a tornado.
 September 11 – an F0 tornado stuck near Batchawana Bay, Ontario, damaging property at Silver Birch Cabins and throwing around tents and lawn furniture.

2008
 May 25 – at least two tornadoes touch down in the province of Manitoba. One was reported near Altona. No damage was reported.
 May 26 - two F0 tornadoes were confirmed in Northern Ontario. The first touched down in Windy Lake Provincial Park near, Sudbury, and the second near Reynolds Lake, northeast of North Bay. No injuries were reported.
 May 31 – a tornado touches down in Niverville, Manitoba. There were no reports of injuries or damage.
 June 6 – an F0 tornado was confirmed in the community of Echo Bay, Ontario. A roof was torn off a warehouse and tractor dealership was damaged.
 June 6 – a weak tornado touches down near Heisler, southeast of Edmonton. Minor property damage was reported.
 June 8 – a possible tornado was detected by doppler radar near Highway 402 in the Strathroy, Ontario area in the late afternoon as strong storms moved through Southeast Michigan and into Southwestern Ontario. Three tornadoes in Ontario. F1 tornado was detected in Ruthven, near Kingsville and Leamington. Other tornadoes touched down near Lucan and Brantford.
 June 9 – a weak tornado touched down near Morris, Manitoba. No injuries or deaths were reported.
 June 10 – a tornado touched down west of Edmonton near Wabamun, Alberta.
 June 22 – an F0 tornado touched down in the Bryanston, Ontario area, just north of London. The twister damaged a large pig barn, and uprooted several trees.
 June 22 – a weak tornado touches down near Viking, Alberta. It damaged some properties including uprooted trees, a damaged fence and tore apart a shed.
 June 27 – five tornadoes touch down in the province of Manitoba. They were reported near Gladstone, Neepawa, Arden, Westbourne and MacGregor areas.
 July 6 – a weak tornado touches down north of Airdrie, Alberta. There was no report of damage or injuries.
 July 7 – a tornado touches down just west of Turtle Mountain Provincial Park, Manitoba, damaging docks and sinking boats. No injuries or fatalities.
 July 10 – an F1 tornado briefly touches down in the Shipshaw area of Saguenay, Quebec.
 July 10 – at least three tornadoes touch down in southeastern Saskatchewan during severe storms. They were reported near Dafoe, Kandahar, Dollard and Stoughton. Damage was also reported in Carlyle where high winds triggered a gas leak at a greenhouse forcing evacuations and a Home Hardware stores roof was ripped off in a storm in Yorkton.
 July 14 – a possible tornado touches down west of Battleford, Saskatchewan.
 July 15 – an F1 tornado touches down east of the small town of Vulcan, Alberta ripping two granaries off their concrete base on a farm.
No major damage or injuries were reported.
 July 19, a waterspout touches down on Turtle Lake, Saskatchewan north of the Battlefords Another tornado was reported near Dundurn south of Saskatoon
 July 22 – a weak F0 tornado touched down near Welland, Ontario, sending sheet metal into the air from a construction site. No significant damage or injuries were reported.
 July 23 – two waterspouts form over the St-Lawrence River in the Montreal area, one in the Port of Montreal area, visible from a large area of the island.
 July 26 – an F1 (possibly an F2) tornado touched down near the town of Coboconk, Ontario at around 2:45 pm EDT (UTC−04:00). Severe weather warnings were in effect at the time of the tornado.
 July 27 – at least four tornadoes touch down near Chamberlin, Girvin, Radisson and Langham, Saskatchewan.
 August 26 – a tornado touches down at a golf course north of Prince Albert, Saskatchewan injuring six.
 September 1 – an unconfirmed tornado touched down near La Broquerie, Manitoba, causing minor damage to the town's area. The tornado was on the ground for about three minutes.

2009

April 25 – five tornadoes were confirmed in Ontario after the passage of an intense cold front on the warmest day of spring. Four were rated as F0 in strength, and touched down in the towns of Round Lake Centre, the west end of Ottawa, Guelph and Windsor. Damage consisted of snapped trees, broken hydro poles and roofs being peeled from buildings. Eighteen planes sustained damage at the Rockcliffe Flying Club. The fifth tornado was rated an F1, and hit the community of Breslau, damaging a barn and silo and uprooting trees over a  path. No injuries were reported.
May 1 – an F0 tornado touched down near Normandin, Quebec, snapping several utility poles.
No damage was reported.
June 1 – southern Manitoba saw its first major storm of the spring, which included an F0 tornado confirmed near Winnipeg.
No damage was reported.
June 25 – two tornadoes were confirmed in Central Alberta, causing slight damage. A second F0 tornado touched down near Cairns, ripping siding and roof tiles from structures.
June 25 – three tornadoes touched down in Southern Ontario in the afternoon hours. An F2 was confirmed near Avon, tearing a roof off a house as a woman washed her hair in the bathroom. She escaped unharmed. Two F1 tornadoes were also confirmed near Leamington and Harrow causing minor damage.
June 30 – an F1 tornado touches down and destroys several farm buildings near Baljennie, Saskatchewan. Another F0 tornado was confirmed near Hafford.
July 4 – a brief F0 landspout tornado was spotted near Swan River, Manitoba. No damage was reported.
July 4 – an F1 tornado touched down near Red Deer, Alberta causing minimal tree damage and no injuries.
July 7 – an F0 tornado was confirmed near Estaire, Ontario
July 7 – an F0 tornado was confirmed in Elbow, Saskatchewan. No damage was reported.
July 9 – two tornadoes touched down in Northwestern Ontario, killing three and injuring five. The first, an F1, touched down near Ear Falls and tracked across Wenesaga Lake through sparsely populated areas. It left a  path snapping trees and damaging homes. The second tornado was given an F2 rating and tore through Fisherman's Cove Resort on Lac Seul, killing three men visiting from Oklahoma. Survivors were found in the lake after the storm, tossed there by the extreme winds.
July 11 – an F1 tornado touched down in Boisbriand, Quebec, just west of Montreal, damaging houses and downing multiple trees. A second tornado also touched down in Mirabel and was given an F0 rating.
July 13 – an F0 tornado was confirmed near Leader, Saskatchewan.
July 26 – a landspout tornado briefly touched down near Woodstock, Ontario, downing one tree. It was given an F0 rating.
July 27 – an F0 tornado was confirmed in Sainte-Christine, Quebec, damaging a shed and uprooting trees. No injuries were reported.
July 29 – an F0 tornado touched down in the Duberger district of Quebec City, Quebec, uprooting trees and causing roof damage to homes.
July 30 – Buffalo Narrows, Saskatchewan saw an F0 tornado touch down. No damage was reported.
July 31 – an F0 tornado was confirmed near Telford, Manitoba.
 August 4 – an F2 tornado touched down between Déléage and Mont-Laurier, Quebec, leaving a  path of damage. Forty homes sustained damage, with twenty-eight rendered uninhabitable. Cars were tossed around, utility poles and power lines broken, and a number of trees were twisted and uprooted. It was the highest rated tornado in the province since 1994. A cameraman for CFCF-TV and a helicopter pilot were killed a day later while gathering aerial footage of the damage.
 August 20 – nineteen confirmed tornadoes touched down in Ontario, the largest single-day tornado outbreak in the province's history. Referred to as the Southern Ontario Tornado Outbreak of 2009, it was one of the most destructive and costly tornado events ever in the province, and included one fatality. The four strongest tornadoes were given an F2 rating, with two of them hitting the densely populated city of Vaughan. Eleven of the tornadoes were given an F1 rating, and the last four were rated as F0. The lone fatality happened in Durham, Ontario, where an 11 year old boy was killed by flying debris. At one point, over 10 million people in Southern Ontario were placed under tornado watches and/or warnings. It is also the largest tornado event in Canadian history.
August 21 – two F0 tornadoes touched down in north central Quebec, one near the Baskatong Reservoir and the other near the town of La Tuque. Minor damage was reported in wooded areas.
September 28 – an F1 tornado was confirmed near Bowmanville, Ontario, damaging barns and uprooting trees.

2010s

2010
 June 5 – a severe weather outbreak that affected the Midwestern United States and Great Lakes region, saw an F1 tornado was touch down in Eastern Ontario, near the villages of Dalkeith and Ste-Anne-de-Prescott, close to the Quebec border. It causing extensive damage to homes, trees and grain bins along an  path.
 June 6 – four tornadoes were confirmed in Southwestern Ontario as a result of a severe weather outbreak in the region. Three brief tornadoes, an F0, F1 and F2, touched down south of Harrow, causing property damage. An F1 tornado also hit Leamington during the early morning hours, before dissipating near Point Pelee National Park. Damage was estimated to be in the millions of dollars, as the tornado uprooted trees and damaged houses and cars, leaving a  path. Luckily, considering the time the tornado hit, there were no reports of injuries or deaths.
 June 21 – two weak tornadoes touched down near Limerick and Avonlea, Saskatchewan.
 June 23 – two confirmed tornadoes touched down near the town of Midland, Ontario. A second tornado rated an F1 spawned from the same thunderstorm, touched down around 7 pm EDT (UTC−04:00), just west of Washago. Its path lasted . Tornado warnings did go off 12 minutes before the first tornado struck, leaving some residents unprepared. In addition a Red Alert was even issued by the Emergency Management of Ontario in a huge swath of Central Ontario. Both twisters left 15 people injured, 8 seriously. There were no fatalities. That same evening after 9 pm EDT (UTC−04:00), storms tracked through the Windsor-Essex County area, where a microburst caused damage near Colchester destroying a party tent and part of a garage, with funnel clouds and a possible tornado reported in the rural areas of the town of Essex, these tornadoes came on the same day just hours after Central Canada was rocked by an earthquake.
 June 23 – a confirmed tornado touched down near Rosser, Manitoba, causing little damage. 
 June 24 – a possible tornado touched down near Wilkie, Saskatchewan.
 June 25 – an unconfirmed tornado touched down near Oxbow, Saskatchewan, damaging a farm.
 June 27 – severe thunderstorms formed in Southeast Michigan and tracked towards Windsor, Ontario, spawning a minor tornado from Essex to roughly Staples, with a second forming near Cottam, in central Essex County.
 June 28 – two F0 tornadoes touched down in the Montreal region, one in Sainte-Anne-de-Bellevue, Quebec, on Montreal's West Island, and one in Mascouche, east of the city. Many funnel clouds were also spotted in the area(s).
 June 29 – a confirmed tornado touched down near Whitecourt, Alberta, northwest of Edmonton. No damage was reported.
 July 2 – an F3 tornado tore through the Kawacatoose Reserve near Raymore, Saskatchewan. Some homes on the reserve were demolished, with several others sustaining damage. It also levelled farmhouses and farms west of the town. There were no deaths, but some people received broken bones, cuts and bruises. It was stated that the tornado could have possibly been on the ground for an hour.
No rating was given for the twister, as no damage was reported.
July 17 – an F0 tornado hit the community of Saint-Lazare, Quebec, near Montreal. The tornado damaged some homes, and toppled trees. Two people were also struck by lightning associated with the storm.
July 22 – an unconfirmed tornado touched down just north of Regina, Saskatchewan. No damage was reported.
July 23 – an F0 tornado touched down in Amherstburg, Ontario around 7 pm EDT (UTC−04:00). The small tornado travelled directly north for a short distance, damaging trees and a roof on small outbuilding, before turning east and dissipating a short time later. There were no injuries reported. The same system also caused a downburst in Kingsville. Another tornado may have touched down near Ruthven, although nothing has been confirmed.
July 25 – two confirmed tornadoes were spotted near the town of Lanigan, Saskatchewan, southeast of Saskatoon. Two more tornadoes touched down near the town of Humboldt. Most damage came from the golf-ball-sized hail associated with the storms, which destroyed several crops in the area.
There were reports of heavy rain and large hail, but no damage.
August 22 – A tornado was reported southwest of Grande Prairie, Alberta.

2011
 April 27 – Environment Canada confirmed an F0 tornado touched down near the town of Fergus, Ontario, as a part of the 2011 Super Outbreak. Multiple trees were blown over, siding was torn from buildings and a large air conditioning unit was thrown from the roof of a retail store.
The twister was likely an F0, but was not confirmed. It touched down in a field, lifted some debris and then dissipated.
June 2 – a weak F0 tornado was spotted northwest of Shaunavon, Saskatchewan as severe thunderstorms hit the area. The Royal Canadian Mounted Police (RCMP) reported damage to granaries in the area, and several power lines were toppled.
June 23 – an F0 tornado briefly touched down near the Ottawa River and moved towards Aylmer, Quebec. No damage was reported.
Damage was reported to a hardware store and some city roads. Power lines were also knocked down.
July 7 – multiple tornadoes touched down in Central Alberta from very strong thunderstorms that swept across the province. One touched down near the town of Bergen, and the others near the towns of Olds and Bowden. One of the hardest hit areas was near Innisfail, where three farms were damaged. A  riding area was also destroyed. There were also reports of hail the size of softballs causing damage to cars and houses.
July 13 – a weak F0 tornado touched down in southwestern Calgary, Alberta. It was originally classified a funnel cloud by Environment Canada, but amateur video of the event showed it was a tornado.
The same storm system later pelted the resort of Waskesiu with baseball-sized hail causing property damage around the townsite with damage to windows, siding and roofs.
July 20 – an F1 tornado touched down between Saguenay and Quebec City, Quebec. Winds were strong enough to pick up a moving car off the highway.
It dissipated just south of Watford, after blowing over eight steel transmission towers and also knocking down several hydro poles. Other damage reports included several trees snapped off and buildings moved from their foundations. One barn was completely destroyed.
Multiple cottages were damaged, and trees uprooted. Environment Canada is also looking into another possible tornado in the Saint-Ludger-de-Milot area.
There was no damage reported.
August 16 – four F1 tornadoes touched down in the heavily wooded areas of Northwestern Ontario. The first occurred near Dryden, leaving a  trail. The fourth F1 also touched down in Ear Falls, near Gerry Lake, leaving a  path. All four tornadoes were given the F1 rating because of the amount of tree damage, and lack of structural damage.
August 21 – an F3 tornado hit Goderich, Ontario in the late afternoon hours. A supercell thunderstorm formed and intensified over Lake Huron, spawning a waterspout which came ashore and passed directly through the heart of Goderich. It caused devastating damage to the town's port and historic downtown centre, as well as to several blocks of residential homes. Approximately forty people were injured and one person was killed. It was Ontario's strongest tornado since 1996.
August 21 – a very weak F1 tornado occurred in the west end of Gananoque, Ontario, twisting trees and demolishing a shed. The track was close to  before it dissipated.
August 24 – two confirmed F1 tornadoes hit Southwestern Ontario, after a line of severe storms swept through the province. The first touched down in the town of Little Corners, near Cambridge and left a  path of toppled trees. A third F0 tornado also touched down in the southwestern part of Grey County, near Neustadt.
September 3 – Environment Canada confirmed that an F0 tornado occurred just west of the town of Grimsby, Ontario. A large gazebo was destroyed and branches were knocked from trees. No injuries were reported.
September 4 – an F0 tornado hit the western part of Trois-Rivières, Quebec in the early evening hours. Damage reports indicated that trees were uprooted, roofs torn off and power was knocked out. The tornado did not last long and there were no reported injuries.
September 18 – an unconfirmed tornado was spotted east of Winnipeg, Manitoba. No damage was reported, and the twister did not last very long.

2012
May 22 – a late-afternoon F0 tornado touched down in a field east of Orono, Ontario. It dissipated quickly, and no injuries or damage was reported.
May 25 – two low-level tornadoes were confirmed in rural areas northwest of Montreal, Quebec. An F0 touched down near the town of Brownsburg-Chatham around 8 pm EDT (UTC−03:00), followed by an F1 that swept through the Saint-Benoît sector of Mirabel. Both tornadoes caused extensive damage estimated to be in the millions. No one was injured.
May 29 – a confirmed F0 tornado touched down east of Ottawa, in the small community of Bourget, Ontario. The tornado was short lived and caused minor roof damage and uprooted trees.
At least three others were reported near Turin, Brooks, and Bow Island.
June 8 – an F1 tornado touched down in Huntingdon, Quebec, severely damaging a gas station and uprooting trees.
June 9 – an unconfirmed tornado touched down north of Stettler, Alberta. Environment Canada referred to it as a "landspout tornado", which is essentially a funnel cloud that touches the ground in a weak thunderstorm system. A farm sustained minor damage to some grain bins, and tree limbs were snapped.
June 15 – eight tornadoes were confirmed near the communities of Plover Lake, Biggar and Wilkie, Saskatchewan. There were several reports of funnel clouds throughout the evening. No damage was reported.
June 18 – an F1 tornado touched down near Sioux Lookout, Ontario, knocking down several trees.
June 26 – a tornado was confirmed near the town of Caron, Saskatchewan and another was reported near Hodgeville. Environment Canada received 500 reports of funnel clouds over a 36-hour period. Damage was limited to farmers' fields and grain silos, and no injuries were reported.
July 3 – at least three tornadoes were confirmed in Saskatchewan. One touched down near the town of Davidson, and heavily damaged a farm. The other two touched down southwest of Wynyard and southwest of Watrous. No injuries were reported.
Damage was also reported to a barn and hay shed, and multiple trees were uprooted. No injuries were reported.
July 17 – two tornadoes were confirmed in Eastern Ontario, hitting the small communities of Athens and Summerstown. Several trees were snapped off or uprooted, damaging houses and cars. A farm just west of town had several hay wagons flipped over, and it tore the woodshed and chimney off a house. Several trees were knocked down, and crops sustained some damage.
July 18 – three confirmed tornadoes touched down in central parts of Saskatchewan. The twisters were reported east of Rose Valley, and at least two more were spotted north and east of Wadena. No damage was reported.
July 21 – two confirmed tornadoes touched down in near Smeaton, Saskatchewan, where a house was destroyed, and a 72-year-old man inside escaped unharmed. It also knocked trees down and grain bins over. A second reported tornado touched down near Emma Lake. There were no reports of damage.
July 22 – an F0 tornado touched down near the town of Embro, Ontario. An Environment Canada employee witnessed the weak tornado in a field; It left no damage.
July 24 – Environment Canada confirmed that five tornadoes touched down in Saskatchewan. All were east of Regina, near communities of Balgonie, Southey, Fillmore, and Grenfell. Minor damage was reported to farm buildings. There was no official word on the strengths of the twisters.
Damage was reported to a nearby farm.
August 2 – an unconfirmed tornado touched down near Lake Diefenbaker, around the town of Elbow, Saskatchewan. No damage or injuries were reported.
August 11 – an F0 tornado was confirmed near Midland, Ontario.
August 30 – an F0 tornado touched down near Chibougamau, Quebec. Damage was reported at a campground where several trees were uprooted.
September 8 – an early evening F0 tornado touched down in Drummondville, Quebec. A roof was blown off a 4-storey building and thrown across the street while other buildings and vehicles sustained minor damage.
September 8 – Environment Canada confirmed that an F2 tornado touched down near the town of Odessa, Ontario. A man was in the workshop at the time of the tornado, but escaped uninjured.
September 22 – an F0 tornado was confirmed in the small town of Wellington, Ontario, along the shoreline of Lake Ontario. Environment Canada said it was possible the tornado formed originally as a waterspout over the lake. Two properties received minor damage to lawn furniture and trees.
October 31 – a weak F0 tornado touched down near the town of Mont-Laurier, Quebec, destroying a barn and blowing road signs over. It was the sixth confirmed tornado for Quebec in 2012.

2013
April 18 – Environment Canada confirmed that an EF1 tornado touched down near the community of Shelburne, Ontario, destroying a large riding stable. No injuries were reported. This tornado represented the change from the Fujita scale, to the Enhanced Fujita scale in Canada.
May 21 – three tornadoes were confirmed in Central Ontario after strong thunderstorms moved across the region. The roof of a home was torn off by the strong winds. Minor damage was reported to a barn roof and silo, and around 65 mature trees were uprooted.
May 22 – an EF0 tornado touched down on Highway 401 near Mallorytown, Ontario. It occurred at 10:30 pm EDT (UTC−04:00) and forcibly moved a truck.
May 29 – an EF0 tornado touched down near Casselman, Ontario, and was confirmed by Environment Canada thanks to amateur video of the funnel cloud lowering.
June 1 – an EF0 tornado touched down near Kenilworth, Ontario, and was on the ground for around one minute. Because of the remote location, no damage was reported.
June 1 – an EF0 tornado was confirmed in the municipality of Saint-Hugues, Quebec. It tore the door off a garage and caused minor roof damage to multiple homes.
June 2 – Environment Canada confirmed that a tornado touched down briefly near Maple Creek, Saskatchewan. No rating was given for the tornado, and no damage or injuries were reported.
June 10 – an unconfirmed tornado touched down southeast of Yorkton, Saskatchewan near the town of Saltcoats. It is unknown if it did any damage.
June 12 – a tornado was reported on the north side of Pigeon Lake, Alberta. It was on the ground very briefly before it went over the lake, resulting in a waterspout.
The tornado was confirmed based upon photographic evidence, showing a weak funnel cloud rotating and briefly reaching the ground. No damage was reported.
June 19 – an unconfirmed tornado was reported north of Onefour, near Pakowki Lake. Multiple photos uploaded to Twitter showed funnel clouds and possible tornado on the ground.
It was rated as a low end EF0, and no damage was reported.
Trees were knocked over and some homes and businesses sustained damage. No injuries were reported. An unconfirmed tornado was also spotted near Stavely, Alberta, related to the same storm system.
July 6 - a brief tornado was reported between Wroxton and Kamsack, Saskatchewan.
July 10 – at around 6:20 pm EDT (UTC−04:00), a weak EF0 tornado touched down near Saint-Marc-des-Carrières, Quebec. No damage was reported.
July 13 – the communities of Pipestone and Hartney, Manitoba were hit by two unconfirmed tornadoes in the early evening, causing damage to multiple homes. Roofs were ripped off, trees knocked over, and mobile homes and trailers were overturned. The storm also brought large hail and heavy rain, causing extensive crop damage.
July 13 – Environment Canada confirmed two tornadoes struck southern Saskatchewan, near the communities of Minton and Redvers. No damage was reported.
July 15 – up to seven tornadoes touched down in parts of southern Saskatchewan after a severe line of thunderstorms swept through the province. Four tornadoes were confirmed by Environment Canada, two of them spotted close to the towns of Kronau and Gray. The other two confirmed were spotted west and southwest of Yorkton. The three unconfirmed tornadoes were reported north of Humboldt, near Rosthern, and near Hague. No damage or injuries were reported.
Five homes on the reserve were damaged and two people were injured.
One house was damaged, and numerous trees were knocked over. No injuries were reported.
July 19 – a weak EF0 tornado touched down near the community of Teviotdale, Ontario, just south of Mount Forest. No injuries or damage was reported.
The hardest hit areas included Whites Cove, where several trees were uprooted and three barns destroyed, and Cambridge-Narrows, where three more structures were destroyed including a large barn.
July 21 – Environment Canada confirmed a tornado touched down between Boissevain and Deloraine, Manitoba in an open field. No damage was reported.
July 24 – a tornado was reported on the ground near Okotoks, Alberta.
It was on the ground for a brief period and confined to a farmer's field. No damage was reported.
July 29 – Environment Canada confirmed an EF0 tornado touched down in Ottawa, close to Orleans, Ontario. No injuries were reported.
Environment Canada used an eye-witness account to confirm the twister. No damage was reported.
August 2 – Environment Canada confirmed an EF0 touched down in Magiskan Lake, north of Cochrane, Ontario. No injuries or damage was reported.
August 7 – three EF0 tornadoes, and one EF1 tornado were confirmed in south-central Ontario within a one-hour period, thanks to video and photographic evidence. The first tornado touched down north of Orillia, followed by another between Arthur and Grand Valley. The third twister happened near Carnarvon. An aerial survey was conducted since it was in such a remote location. No injuries or major damage was reported. In addition to these tornadoes, Environment Canada also added one that was previously classified as a waterspout. It happened over Head Lake, in the northern part of the Kawartha Lakes region. The waterspout was added to the 2013 tornado count because in this case, it was associated with a storm system.
August 13 – a weak EF0 tornado hit Sherbrooke, Quebec, causing roof damage to a car dealership and breaking several windows.
August 16 – a small EF0 tornado touched down in the Cabano, Quebec area before moving out over Lake Témiscouata and turning into a waterspout. No damage was reported.
September 1 – a confirmed tornado touched down near Fergus, Ontario in a farmer's field. Environment Canada classified it as a low end EF0 tornado since no damage was reported. It was also rated as a low end EF0 in strength
November 23 – a rare, late season tornado was confirmed north of Prescott, Ontario. The tornado was rated as an EF1, and caused significant structural damage to a farm silo. No injuries were reported.

2014
May 13 – Environment Canada confirmed two tornadoes touched down in Southern Ontario. A house and barn sustained damage and multiple trees were snapped. The second tornado was rated an EF0, and spotted southeast of Listowel, near Conestogo Lake.
May 26 – a weak EF0 tornado touched down near Roxton Falls, Quebec, tearing the roof from a farm building. Another tornado was confirmed near Laurierville thanks to video evidence, but was not given a rating.
June 13 – a confirmed tornado touched down northwest of Gleichen, Alberta in the early evening hours. Two funnel clouds were noticed with one briefly touching the ground. No damage was reported.
June 17 – two tornadoes were confirmed in Central Ontario, the first being a high-end EF2, which hit the town of Angus. Around 100 homes were either destroyed or sustained damage before the twister dissipated in the south end of Barrie. A tornado warning was in effect for the area at the time, and only a few minor injuries were reported. The second tornado, an EF1, touched down near the Stroud area, and left a  path of uprooted trees and destroyed a farm shed. The same system also produced two unconfirmed tornadoes, one in Grey County, near Owen Sound Billy Bishop Regional Airport, and another near the town of Hanover.
June 24 – Southern Ontario again saw two confirmed tornadoes, spawning from the same storm system. The first, an EF1, traveled  from Orangeville to Amaranth, destroying a recreational vehicle (RV) and causing damage to the roof of a house. It also downed numerous trees and snapped hydro poles. The second, also an EF1, happened around a half hour later in the town of New Tecumseth, northeast of Orangeville. It damaged 18 properties along a  path, including a horse barn where a horse perished. A house also sustained major damage to the garage where the roof was torn off. No injuries were reported from either twister.
No damage was reported.
June 29 – a tornado was confirmed near Wainwright, Alberta thanks to photo and video evidence. No damage was reported.
June 30 – a confirmed EF0 tornado touched down over Bear Lake, Ontario, and was caught on video by a boater. The video shows the tornado crossing the lake and then head inland, where it quickly dissipated. Only minor tree damage was reported.
June 30 – an EF0 tornado was confirmed in the municipality of Laforce, Quebec, uprooting several trees.
No damage was reported and it was on the ground for under a minute.
July 5 – Environment Canada confirmed six tornadoes touched down in central Saskatchewan, giving ratings to two. An EF0 was also confirmed in Kenaston, knocking over tombstones in a cemetery and damaging trees. The other four tornadoes were not rated and were only on the ground for a brief period.
July 7 – a brief tornado was reported and later confirmed near Norwich, Ontario, south of Woodstock. Environment Canada confirmed the low end EF0 tornado thanks to photographic evidence. No injuries or damage was reported.
July 9 – an early morning storm system spawned three tornadoes in southern Quebec. An EF1 tornado touched down near the Sainte-Apolline-de-Patton region, damaging two homes. A second EF1 also touched down near Lambton with minor damage reported. The third tornado struck near Saint-Fabien-de-Panet and was rated an EF2. It caused significant tree damage to a large wooded area. Tornado warnings were in place for both areas at the time.
July 15 – two EF0 tornadoes were confirmed near North Bay, Ontario, after strong thunderstorms moved through the area. The first was actually a waterspout over Lake Nipissing, but Environment Canada included it in the tornado count since it was associated with a thunderstorm over a small body of water. The second tornado touched down just south of North Bay/Jack Garland Airport. No damage was reported with either twister.
July 26 – three weak tornadoes were confirmed in Manitoba according to Environment Canada. The first two touched the ground briefly near Waterhen, and the third just southeast of La Salle. The tornadoes were not given a rating and there were no reports of damage.
July 27 – two tornadoes touched down in Southern Ontario from the result of severe thunderstorms. The first was rated an EF1 and touched down south of Grand Bend, snapping hydro poles and knocking over trees. Some homes and vehicles were also damaged with one serious injury reported. Spotters described seeing swirling dust and debris at the bottom of a funnel cloud, indicating that a tornado briefly formed. The tornado was given a low EF0 rating and no damage was reported.
July 31 – an EF1 tornado hit the small community of Pont-Rouge, Quebec, as confirmed by Environment Canada, causing significant damage to the roof of a house. Trees were also uprooted and shed was blown away. No injuries were reported.
August 5 – Environment Canada confirmed a weak EF0 tornado touched down in Asubpeeschoseewagong First Nation (Grassy Narrows First Nation) community in Northwestern Ontario, causing damage to the roof of one house. The tornado was confirmed thanks to eyewitness accounts, archived radar data and photographic evidence.
August 19 – two EF0 tornadoes were confirmed by Environment Canada in Southwestern Ontario. A number of trees were snapped and a gazebo was destroyed. The second tornado occurred northeast of Harrow where a barn lost part of its roof.
August 20 – a short lived EF0 tornado was confirmed near the town of Erin, Ontario thanks to video evidence. No damage was reported.
September 5 – two tornadoes were confirmed in Central Ontario after severe weather swept through the area. The first, a low-end EF0, hit Christian Island causing tree damage. Six farms, three houses and a community centre storage building were damaged. No injuries were reported.
Multiple trees were snapped along a 900-metre path.
No injuries were reported.

2015

No injuries were reported.
No damage was reported.
A photo posted to Twitter from a storm chaser in the area showed what appeared to be a tornado on the ground. Environment Canada cited "there was minor damage reported in the area, as well as evidence that objects "moved in different directions"". No injuries were reported.
June 21 – an unrated tornado was confirmed by Environment Canada near Cochrane, Alberta. Funnel cloud advisories had been in effect for much of Southern Alberta throughout the day.
June 24 – two EF0 landspout tornadoes were confirmed in southern Manitoba near the town of Manitou. Damage was localized to field crops and no injuries were reported. Parts of the province had been under tornado warnings at the time.
Storm spotters reported it was on the ground for 3 to 5 minutes. No damage or injuries were reported.
The weak tornado was on land for approximately 20–30 minutes. There were no reports of injuries or damage.
Video evidence helped Environment Canada to confirm the brief touchdown, but they did not give it a rating. There were no reports of major damage. Another unrated tornado was also confirmed near Gleichen, causing no damage.
July 27 – a high end EF2 tornado was confirmed near Tilston, Manitoba, close to the Manitoba–Saskatchewan and Canada–US borders. The large tornado was up to a kilometre wide at one point, and multiple vortices were seen swirling in fields. It severely damaged a farm, overturning trucks and destroying outbuildings and grain bins. A bridge was also damaged on Provincial Road 256, lifting asphalt from the road. Most significantly it was on the ground for 2.5 to 3 hours, making it the longest lived tornado documented in Canada and possibly one of the longest lived in the world. There were no reports of injuries.
August 2 – four tornadoes were confirmed in Southern Ontario after severe storms swept through the southwestern and central parts of the province. It destroyed a barn, and severely damaged two houses. Five Ontario Provincial Police (OPP) cruisers also sustained damage. Another EF1 was confirmed in the Millgrove area, north of Hamilton, leaving a small damage path with damage to roofs and trees. Luckily no injuries were reported.
August 3 – an EF0 tornado was confirmed in the Matapedia Valley, Quebec, near the parish municipality of Saint-Zénon-du-Lac-Humqui. No injuries were reported.
No damage was reported, but Environment Canada later confirmed it as an unrated tornado.
There were no reports of damage.
No damage was reported.
Environment Canada was notified of the tree damage thanks to a pilot flying over the area.
September 1 - a funnel cloud was reported to have briefly touched down in the waters near Conception Bay South, Newfoundland and Labrador, thus deeming it a waterspout.
September 13 – an unrated tornado was confirmed near Didsbury, Alberta causing no damage.
October 15 – an EF0 tornado was confirmed in Coniston, Ontario, just east of Sudbury thanks to video evidence and eyewitness reports. Multiple trees were snapped, some homes sustained roof damage and a trampoline was lifted  in the air. No injuries were reported.

2016

March 16 – the earliest confirmed tornado in the province's history touched down near Mount Forest, Ontario, damaging a barn and uprooting trees. No injuries were reported.
April 13 – an EF0 landspout tornado was confirmed just outside the city of Calgary, Alberta, causing no damage.
May 31 – Environment Canada confirmed an EF0 landspout tornado touched down east of Miami, Manitoba, causing no damage.
June 2 – an EF0 tornado touched down in Maniwaki, Quebec, damaging buildings and uprooting trees. No injuries were reported.
It was on the ground for under 5 minutes and no damage was reported.
June 19 – two unrated landspout tornadoes were confirmed by Environment Canada near Naicam, Saskatchewan. Both tornadoes were on the ground for less than 5 minutes and caused no damage.
No damage was reported.
June 20 – an EF2 tornado touched down near Lac Verne, Quebec, destroying a cottage and snapping multiple trees. Two people were seriously injured.
June 30 – an EF1 tornado was confirmed in Ponoka, Alberta, causing damage to a handful of homes. No injuries were reported.
July 1 – two EF0 tornadoes touched down in Central Ontario causing minimal damage. The first occurred over Buckhorn Lake, in Peterborough County.
July 1 – a confirmed tornado touched down west of Biggar, Saskatchewan in a farmer's field. It was not given a rating and lasted about 5 minutes.
July 2 – two EF0 tornadoes were confirmed in Alberta.
July 3 – Environment Canada confirmed an EF1 tornado touched down near Hardisty, Alberta, damaging a farm in the area.
July 4 – an EF0 tornado touched down in the area of Métabetchouan–Lac-à-la-Croix, uprooting trees and damaging a farm building.
July 6 – a weak EF0 was confirmed through Environment Canada near Monitor, Alberta causing no damage.
July 7 – Environment Canada confirmed a non-rated landspout tornado touched down southeast of Estevan, Saskatchewan. No damage was reported.
July 10 – an unrated tornado was confirmed near Herbert, Saskatchewan
July 13 – an EF0 landspout tornado was confirmed northeast of Endiang, Alberta causing no damage.
July 18 – an EF1 tornado touched down near Roxton Falls, Quebec, in the municipality of Ulverton, destroying a barn and uprooting trees.
July 19 – an EF2 tornado was confirmed near Davidson, Saskatchewan, destroying multiple farm buildings.
July 20 – three tornadoes were confirmed in southern Manitoba, the largest given a preliminary EF1 rating and touching down in the southern part of Long Plain First Nation. Roofs were blown off houses, trees uprooted and some homes were separated from their foundations. The two other weak tornadoes touched down near Hartney, and Souris, causing no damage.
July 23 – an unrated tornado touched down near Sturgis, Saskatchewan
July 23 – Environment Canada confirmed a landspout tornado touched down briefly near Russell, Manitoba. There was no reported damage.
July 31 – two EF2 tornadoes were confirmed in East Central Saskatchewan, destroying a house and leaving significant damage to several farms. No injuries were reported.
August 3 – three tornadoes were confirmed in southern Manitoba, the first touching down near Margaret. It was short lived, causing minor damage. A second tornado hit areas west of Glenboro and destroyed a barn, killing 150 sheep. A third tornado was confirmed near Morden, uprooting trees.
August 3 – Environment Canada confirmed two unrated tornadoes touched down in Saskatchewan.
August 4 – a probable landspout tornado touched down east of Vermilion, Alberta. No damage was reported.
August 8 – four tornadoes were confirmed in Manitoba by Environment Canada, including two given a preliminary mid to high end EF2 rating. Seven homes were damaged and one destroyed and the tornado also overturned a school bus. The second EF2 occurred northeast of Erickson, causing roof damage and destroying small structures. Extensive damage was also caused to a nearby forest. Another tornado touched down south of Russell and was given a preliminary rating of EF0 based on tree damage. An unrated fourth tornado occurred near Elphinstone.
August 10 – an unrated landspout tornado was confirmed north of Schuler, Alberta causing no damage.
August 11 – a weak EF0 tornado touched down in Delaware, Ontario, removing siding from homes and damaging a crop of corn.
August 13 – an EF1 tornado was confirmed in the Port Bolster and Sunset Beach communities of Georgina, Ontario, damaging a boat shelter and other buildings. A second, EF0 tornado also touched down near Ashburn, snapping trees and causing crop damage.
August 24 – two tornadoes touched down in Essex County, Ontario after a supercell thunderstorm developed over the Detroit River. After it lifted, another stronger tornado, an EF2, struck the nearby city of Windsor. It damaged multiple buildings near the E. C. Row Expressway and Central Avenue along an  path. Three people were injured.
August 24 – an unconfirmed landspout tornado occurred near Eddystone, Manitoba. No damage was reported.
August 26 - a tornado was confirmed near Melfort, Saskatchewan.
September 10 – a thunderstorm producing a waterspout over Lake Ontario that came ashore as an EF0 tornado in Prince Edward County, Ontario, tracking  to the east before dissipating. The twister snapped limbs off trees and caused minor property damage. No injuries were reported.
October 17 – an EF1 tornado was confirmed in Stayner, Ontario, snapping multiple trees and overturning a large camper trailer.

2017

April 11 - an EF1 tornado was confirmed near Thamesford, Ontario, northeast of London, damaging a barn and knocking over utility poles along an  path. No injuries were reported.
May 14 - two landspout tornadoes were confirmed north of Saskatoon, Saskatchewan, near the towns of Hepburn and Hoey. Damage to a horse shed was reported.
No injuries were reported.
No damage was reported.
June 14 - a tornado was confirmed near Dryden, Ontario.
June 18 - eleven tornadoes were confirmed in Quebec, marking the province's largest tornado outbreak ever recorded. The strongest, an EF3, struck near Sainte-Anne-des-Lacs, Quebec, completely leveling two homes along a  track. Four EF2 tornadoes touched down including one near Hébertville, which left a damage path  in length. Five EF1 twisters were also confirmed, as well as an EF0 in the Laurentides Wildlife Reserve. Originally only four tornadoes were confirmed, but the total was changed in 2018 after extensive research thanks to a team from Western University and Environment and Climate Change Canada embarked on a challenging and far-reaching study called The Northern Tornadoes Project.
It lasted only a few minutes and no damage was reported.
A meteorologist with Environment Canada said the touchdown was brief and no one was injured.
July 5 - an EF2 tornado touched down in Alida, Saskatchewan, severely damaging a house. No injuries were reported.
July 6 - an EF2 tornado was confirmed in Quetico Provincial Park in northwestern Ontario thanks to aerial reconnaissance by the Provincial Ministry of Natural Resources and Forestry. No injuries were reported.
July 9 - Sunchild First Nation, Alberta was hit with an EF0 tornado causing no damage.
No damage was reported. 
July 12 - two EF0 tornadoes were confirmed in Ontario, the first touching down north of Lucan, leaving a 170 meter wide,  damage path and overturning multiple camper trailers at a local storage facility. The second tornado formed over Lake Simcoe as a tornadic waterspout. No damage was reported. 
July 13 - Two tornadoes were confirmed in Alberta after severe weather swept through the province. The second tornado touched down near Athabasca over an open field and no damage was reported. The twister was given a preliminary EF0 rating. No injuries were reported.
July 21 - Six tornadoes were confirmed in southern Saskatchewan; the first two touching down north of Lanigan. The other four touched down near the town of Quill Lake, near Fishing Lake, near Jansen and between Wapella and Rocanville. Environment Canada has not yet rated any of these tornadoes, and no damage was reported.
July 25 - an unrated tornado was confirmed near Dryden, Ontario.
August 4 - three tornadoes were confirmed in Ontario's Cottage country after an afternoon of severe weather. The second, also an EF1, left a  damage path on the south side of Huntsville before heading out over Fairy Lake as a tornadic waterspout. Trees were snapped, docks were flipped and many cottages sustained roof damage. The third tornado was rated as an EF2 and touched down in the Lake of Bays area. It carved a  path from Pell Lake to Dotty Lake, snapping numerous trees and causing structural damage to cottages. No injuries were reported.
August 5 - an EF1 tornado touched down in Saint-Joseph-de-Beauce, Quebec, snapping trees and destroying buildings. The damage was contained to 4 properties in the area and no injuries were reported.
August 11 - Environment Canada confirmed two tornadoes touched down in Southern Ontario. The first occurred near Leamington, and damaged solar panels and a greenhouse. It was given an EF0 rating. It tore a  path which damaged farm buildings and sheds, knocked heavy machinery over and snapped power poles. Luckily no injuries were reported.
No injuries were reported.
No injuries were reported.
No damage was reported.
No injuries were reported.

2018

May 24 - an EF0 landspout tornado was confirmed near Calmar, Alberta causing no damage.
May 24 - two landspout tornadoes were confirmed in southern Saskatchewan near Tyvan and Gerald.
June 13 - two tornadoes were confirmed in Southern Ontario after strong storms swept through the province. Several barns were destroyed, multiple buildings sustained roof damage and trees were uprooted and sheared apart. One person sustained minor injuries. The second tornado, an EF0, briefly touched down near Norwich causing minimal damage.
No damage was reported.
No damage was reported.
July 1 - a waterspout tornado was confirmed over Lake Manitoba near St. Laurent, Manitoba, approximately 80 km (50 mi) northwest of Winnipeg, Manitoba, causing no damage.
No damage was reported.
July 9 - three EF0 tornadoes touched down in Saskatchewan near the towns of Cantuar, Swift Current and Chaplin, causing no damage.
July 10 - eight tornadoes were confirmed in southern Saskatchewan. All but two were given ratings of EF0 by Environment and Climate Change Canada (ECCC). The next 2 touched down near Val Marie. An EF1 tornado then occurred near Ferland. As the storm system moved east, 2 tornadoes were confirmed southwest of Wood Mountain, one given an EF2 rating. The last two touched down near Fife Lake and Coronach.
July 22 - a tornado was confirmed northeast of Langenburg, Saskatchewan, near the Manitoba provincial border. It uprooted several large trees.
July 22 - a waterspout tornado was confirmed on Lake of the Prairies, near Roblin, Manitoba. No damage was reported.
It destroyed several homes, at least two cottages and several recreational trailers at the Margaret Bruce Beach Campground along an 800 metre wide path before dissipating over Lake Manitoba. Two people suffered minor injuries and one fatality was confirmed, the first tornado-related fatality in Canada since the 2011 Goderich tornado.
August 27 - a high end EF0 tornado touched down north of Barrie, Ontario, tracking from Guthrie to Oro Station and possibly across Lake Simcoe before dissipating. It caused minimal damage to trees and buildings and snapped a  communications tower in half  along a  path.
It uprooted many trees and one mobile home was completely destroyed. 
September 11 - A probable landspout tornado was reported near Nanton, Alberta.
September 21 - Three tornadoes were confirmed in Eastern Ontario causing extensive damage. The first, an EF1, developed over Calabogie and tracked to White Lake. Several houses sustained roof damage and trees were snapped and uprooted. The second tornado touched down in the city of Ottawa and was given a high end EF3 rating. It tossed cars, snapped trees and destroyed or severely damaged dozens of homes. The third tornado, an EF2, hit the Arlington Woods area of Ottawa, snapping hydro poles and damaging trees and buildings. All together at least 25 people were injured, 6 seriously. The EF3 tornado is only the second with that rating to touch down in Canada in September or later. 
September 21 - Environment and Climate Change Canada confirmed three EF1 tornadoes touched down in Quebec, associated with the tornado outbreak in Ontario the same day. The first touched down near the Val-des-Bois area, leaving a  path of snapped trees and damaged buildings. Satellite pictures showed damage to trees and power lines.
September 25 - Three tornadoes touched down in extreme Southwestern Ontario, near Windsor, after tornado warned storms swept through the region. Environment and Climate Change Canada (ECCC) confirmed a probable EF0 tornado hit first near Amherstburg where a brick welcome sign was blown over and large tree branches were snapped. There was no evidence of a long and narrow path of damage, but it was in line with the damage path of a tornado that occurred earlier that day in Michigan. The other two tornadoes were given EF1 ratings and touched down near the towns of McGregor and Staples. Both twisters caused roof and building damage and downed trees along a  path that was approximately 50 metres wide. No injuries were reported.

2019
No damage was reported.
June 2 – a probable EF1 landspout tornado hit the town of Fort Smith, Northwest Territories, damaging homes and snapping trees. 
Multiple trees were uprooted or snapped and many homes sustained roof damage. One person suffered minor injuries. 
June 13 - an EF0 tornado was confirmed 15 km (9 mi) southeast of Strathmore, Alberta. 
June 13 – a probable EF0 tornado touched down in Puslinch, Ontario, northwest of Hamilton, causing minor damage.
June 14 – an EF0 tornado touched down near Seven Persons, Alberta causing no damage.
No damage was reported.
No damage was reported.
June 26 – a brief EF0 landspout tornado touched down near Millet, Alberta causing no damage.
June 28 – seven tornadoes were confirmed in Alberta; five EF0s and two EF1s. The two EF1s touched down near Wolf Lake and Seibert Lake.
June 29 – two tornadoes touched down in Meadow Lake Provincial Park in Saskatchewan, near Murray Doell Campground. A camper trailer was turned over and many other trailers were damaged by fallen trees. Three people suffered minor injuries.
June 29 - an EF0 tornado touched down near Grovedale, Alberta.
July 1 – two tornadoes were confirmed in Saskatchewan after severe storms swept across the province. Both tornadoes were given an EF0 rating.
July 7 – a probable tornado was reported near Mossbank, Saskatchewan.
July 11 - an EF0 tornado was confirmed near Pembroke, Ontario, snapping trees and causing minor property damage.
July 12 - three EF0 tornadoes were confirmed in Saskatchewan after a round of stormy weather. The first touched down near Moose Jaw, then turned into a waterspout over Old Wives Lake. The other two tornadoes touched down northwest and south of the community of Rockglen. No damage or injuries were reported. 
July 13 - an EF0 tornado touched down near Northgate, Saskatchewan causing no damage.
July 16 - an EF0 tornado touched down north of Oyen, Alberta.
No injuries were reported.
July 18 - an EF0 landspout tornado was confirmed on Red Pheasant First Nation in Saskatchewan. No damage was reported.
Two EF0 waterspouts were also confirmed over Dauphin Lake. No damage was reported.
July 24 - Two tornadoes touched down in Alberta. No damage was reported. The second was an EF2 tornado near Hanmore Lake, destroying cabins, boats, and downing many trees.
It destroyed multiple camper trailers, snapped trees and damaged cottages. Three people suffered minor injuries.
August 21 - An EF1 tornado was confirmed by the Northern Tornado Project in Lac-des-Écorces, Quebec, near Mont-Laurier The tornado happened around 10:30 P.M. and was first classified as a downburst, but further investigation found it was a tornado. Damages were mainly snapped trees, a ripped off roof, several damaged roofs (roof shingles), a lifted garage building, and 2 damaged mobile homes one of which was moved.
Sept 2 - An EF0 tornado touched down near Griffin, Saskatchewan, causing no damage.
Sept 11 - An EF1 tornado was confirmed near Petrolia, Ontario, damaging a barn, multiple sheds and snapping trees along a  path. No injuries were reported.

2020s

2020
May 21 – a weak EF0 landspout tornado touched down in the community of North Saanich, British Columbia, on Vancouver Island. The twister lifted a trampoline into the air; no other damage was reported.
No damage was reported.
May 31 - an EF0 tornado touched down near Beiseker, Alberta, approximately 77 km (48 mi) northeast of Calgary.
June 10 - ten tornadoes were confirmed across Ontario, classifying it as an outbreak, after powerful storms swept across the province. Six EF1 tornadoes touched down in Bracebridge, Belmont, Baysville, Mordolphin, Avon, Dwight and Lake Lavieille snapping trees and damaging structures. Three more EF0 tornadoes were confirmed in Belgrave, Brussels and Newbury, also damaging trees and farm buildings. No injuries were reported.
June 13 - an EF0 tornado was confirmed near Barnwell, Alberta, approximately 43 km (27 mi) east of Lethbridge.
June 19 - an EF0 tornado was confirmed near Staples, Ontario, between Comber and Leamington, causing no damage.
June 23 - an EF1 tornado was confirmed at Sturgeon Lake, in the City of Kawartha Lakes, north of Lindsay, Ontario. It destroyed a boathouse; no injuries were reported.
June 24 - an EF0 tornado was confirmed north of Lac Saint-Jean, Quebec, uprooting trees and overturning a pontoon boat.
No injuries were reported.
June 28 - an EF0 tornado was confirmed near Saint-Sébastien, Quebec, causing no damage. 
No damage or injuries were reported.
July 2 - an EF2 tornado was confirmed near Armit, Saskatchewan after satellite imagery revealed a tornado damage path through forested areas. 
July 4 - Environment and Climate Change Canada confirmed three tornadoes touched down in southern Saskatchewan. The first, an EF0, happened near Glenbain with no damage reported. The second, an EF1, touched down near Meyronne, staying on the ground for 40 minutes and destroying a garage, and damaging vehicles and a boat. The third, rated an EF0, was confirmed near Assiniboia, causing no damage.
July 7 - five EF0 tornadoes were confirmed across southeastern Alberta, causing no damage. They occurred east of Keoma, west of Acme, west of Trochu, a few kilometers north of Brooks and south of Red Deer.
July 10 - an EF0 tornado was confirmed near Milton, Ontario.
July 12 - an EF1 tornado touched down near Nanton, Alberta, damaging a farm.
July 13 - an EF2 tornado touched down near Stout Lake, Ontario, leaving a  damage path.
July 16 - an EF0 tornado was confirmed thanks to viewer video near Brantford, Ontario. No damage was reported.
July 16 - an EF0 tornado was confirmed near Manawan, Quebec, causing no damage.
July 19 - nine tornadoes were confirmed in southwestern Ontario after a line of severe storms swept across the province. Six were given an EF1 rating and caused damage to multiple farms and homes and also to crops and trees. They were confirmed north Lucan, in Beachville, near Blyth, near Gads Hill, near Thedford and near Eden Mills. The three others were given EF0 ratings and touched down in Belmont, near St. Columban and along the Lambton Shores near Kettle Point. An EF0 waterspout was also confirmed on Lake Huron. It is not included in the season total.
July 19 - an EF2 tornado was confirmed in Saint-Vital-de-Clermont Quebec, causing tree damage. An EF1 tornado was also confirmed near Lac Turgeon, causing minor tree damage.
July 23 - an EF0 tornado was confirmed near Sainte-Sabine-de-Bellechasse, thanks to a witness photo. No damage was reported.
It causing significant damage to homes, trees and a baseball diamond. No damage was reported and it has been given a default rating of EF0.
August 2 - four tornadoes were confirmed in Ontario. It snapped trees and hydro poles and ripped off roofs. The second, an EF1, touched down near Bexley, in a forested area. The third, a low-end EF0, touched down near Oxford Mills, southwest of Kemptville, causing no damage. The fourth, an EF2, hit near Kinmount, north of Peterborough. It snapped trees and damaged a church and cemetery.
No damage was reported.
August 4 - an EF0 tornado was confirmed near Estevan, Saskatchewan causing no damage.
August 4 - an EF0 tornado touched down north of Palmerston, Ontario causing minor damage.
It damaged a farm and threw vehicles into the air, killing two people and seriously injuring another.
August 13 - an EF0 tornado was confirmed near Alexander, Manitoba, causing no damage.
August 16 - an EF0 was confirmed in Kent Bridge, Ontario, causing no damage.
August 21 - a rare EF0 tornado was confirmed in Fort St. John, British Columbia, damaging homes and fences. No injuries were reported.
August 21 - two EF0 landspout tornadoes were confirmed in Saskatchewan, near Fulda, and north of Humboldt, causing no damage.
August 21 - an EF0 tornado was confirmed in Shoal Lake, Manitoba thanks to storm spotter video showing a funnel cloud and possible tornado. Satellite imagery revealed a track of crop damage in the vicinity of the reports. A second EF0 tornado was also confirmed near Tuckers Lake, Manitoba, also due to witness video.
August 24 - a rare EF0 waterspout was confirmed over Bay St. George, Newfoundland And Labrador thanks to eyewitness photos.
August 27 - two EF1 tornadoes touched down in extreme Southwestern Ontario, damaging barns and snapping trees. They were confirmed near Union and Mount Carmel. No injuries were reported.
August 28 - an EF0 tornado was confirmed in Point Clark, Ontario, snapping trees and damaging homes. No injuries were reported.
September 3 - two tornadoes were confirmed in Ontario. An EF1 tornado touched down near Washago, snapping trees and damaging cottages. The second, an EF0 tornado, hit the east side of Port Colborne, Ontario, leaving a  path of damage.
September 13 - an EF1 tornado touched down southwest of Pembroke, Ontario, causing damage to trees and homes along a  path.
September 30 - an EF1 tornado was confirmed north of Hamilton, Ontario, causing significant damage to a farm. No injuries were reported.
October 23 - a late year EF0 tornado was confirmed in Thornbury, Ontario, damaging trees and power poles.
November 15 - A rare late year EF1 tornado was confirmed in Georgetown, Ontario, uprooting trees and damaging homes. No injuries were reported.

2021

No damage was reported.
May 14 - two EF0 landspout tornadoes were confirmed by eyewitness video near Friedensruh and Roblin, Manitoba. No damage was reported.
May 15 - an EF0 landspout tornado was confirmed near Sandy Bay, Manitoba, thanks to eyewitness photos, causing no damage.
May 15 - an EF0 tornado was confirmed near Saint-Méthode-de-Frontenac, Quebec.
May 25 - an EF2 tornado was confirmed in a heavily wooded area near Little Antler Lake, Ontario, southwest of Chapleau. An EF1 tornado also touched down north of Gogama, causing tree damage.
May 25 - three EF2 tornadoes were confirmed west of Val-d'Or, from the same supercell storm that produced a tornado in Ontario earlier the same day. They all touched down in heavily wooded areas near Petit lac Bull Rock, Lac des Deux Cantons and Lac Simson.
June 5 - two EF0 tornadoes were confirmed in Alberta; one near Longview, and the other near Blackie. No damage was reported.
June 5 - an EF0 tornado touched down near Biggar, Saskatchewan, causing no damage.
June 6 - an EF0 landspout tornado was confirmed near Joffre, Alberta.
June 9 - three EF0 waterspouts were confirmed over the Strait of Georgia along the British Columbia coast.
June 9 - an EF0 tornado was confirmed in Altona, Manitoba, damaging trees and a trailer.
June 10 - for the second day in a row, two waterspouts were confirmed over the Strait of Georgia, in British Columbia. They were both given an EF0 rating.
June 11 - an EF0 landspout tornado was confirmed in Thorndale, Ontario causing no damage.
June 14 - an EF0 waterspout was confirmed over Lake Erie, near Long Point, Ontario.
June 15 - three EF0 tornadoes were confirmed in central Saskatchewan, near D'Arcy, Fiske and McGee, damaging grain bins, trees and crops.
June 21 - six tornadoes were confirmed in southern Quebec. An EF1 touched down near Saint-Narcisse-de-Beaurivage, south of Quebec City.Four EF0 tornadoes were also confirmed, touching down near Saint-Valentin, south of Montreal, Saint-Célestin, south of Trois-Rivières, Saint-Elzéar and Sainte-Marie, south of Quebec City.
June 26 - three tornadoes were confirmed in Southern Ontario, including an EF2, which touched down north of Chatsworth. It damaged several homes, downed trees and destroyed a barn. An EF1 also touched down north of Maynooth, snapping hydro poles and trees. The third, an EF0, occurred north of Goderich, causing no damage. No injuries were reported.
June 30 - a rare Maritimes tornado touched down near Stewiacke, Nova Scotia destroying a barn and snapping trees. It was given an EF1 rating; no injuries were reported.
July 13 - an EF0 tornado touched down in Penetanguishene, Ontario, damaging trees and power lines along a  path. An EF2 tornado also touched down near Beachburg, in Ontario's Whitewater Region, causing extensive tree damage. An EF1 tornado, occurring concurrently to the EF2 twister, also caused damage on Butternut Island.
July 13 - two tornadoes were confirmed in Quebec. An EF1 developed near Fieldville, causing mainly tree damage. The second tornado, an EF0, touched down near Notre-Dame-du-Laus, also damaging trees.
July 15 - nine tornadoes touched down across Southern and Eastern Ontario, all but one given an EF2 rating. The first, struck Barrie, Ontario, damaging at least 70 homes and injuring 11 people at almost EF3 strength (a finalized rating of high-end EF2 was applied). Three tornadoes then formed from one supercell, touching down east of Brown Hill, southwest of Vallentyne and north of Sonya, causing structural and tree damage. 1 person was injured. The fifth tornado touched down west of Lorneville, leaving a  damage path. Two tornadoes hit near Dwight and Lake Traverse causing extensive tree damage. An eighth was confirmed near Sunbeam Lake in Algonquin Park, injuring two campers. The final tornado, an EF1, was confirmed between Chalk River and Petawawa in a heavily treed area.
July 15 - an EF1 tornado was confirmed near Sheenboro, Quebec, thanks to viewer video captured across the Ottawa River in Petawawa.
July 20 - an EF0 tornado was confirmed on Whitestone Lake, south of Dunchurch, Ontario, damaging trees and cottages.
July 22 - an EF0 tornado touched down near Antrim, Nova Scotia, in the Musquodoboit Valley, causing no damage.
July 24 - four tornadoes were confirmed in Southwestern Ontario. Three were given an EF0 rating, and touched down near Thornbury, Bayfield, and Windsor, causing minor tree and structural damage. The fourth, an EF1, damaged trees and a greenhouse near Leamington.
August 10 - an EF0 tornado was confirmed east of London, Ontario near the airport.
August 11 - 6 tornadoes were confirmed in Northeastern Ontario. Two EF1's touched down near Urquhart Lake and Campover Lake, and four EF2 tornadoes touched down near Dunns Valley, Kynoch, Blinko Lake and Elliot Lake. Satellite imagery helped confirm the twisters, which all occurred in heavily treed areas. Seven downbursts were also confirmed.
August 23 - two tornadoes were confirmed in Saskatchewan. It was given an EF2 rating. The second, an EF0, touched down east of Kindersley, causing no damage. Environment and Climate Change Canada is investigating a third tornado, also southwest of Hodgeville.
August 24 - an EF0 tornado was confirmed east of Ituna, Saskatchewan, causing no damage.
August 29 - an EF1 tornado was confirmed near Aubrey Lake, Ontario, causing damage to a heavily treed area.
August 29 - two EF1 tornadoes were confirmed in western Quebec, near Lake Turgeon, and near Lac Patrie.
September 5 - three concurrent EF0 tornadoes were confirmed over Lake Huron, west of Pike Bay, causing no damage.
September 6 - an early morning EF0 tornado was confirmed in Port Albert, Ontario damaging trees.
September 7 - ten tornadoes were confirmed after severe thunderstorms tore through southern Ontario. The strongest, a multi-vortex hybrid supercell-QLCS with an EF2 rating, caused significant damage near Lucknow, and grew to an incredible 1.3 kilometres wide. The system also produced 4 other EF0 tornadoes over Lake Huron before coming ashore; west of Kingsbridge, west of Amberley and west of Port Albert. A second EF2 touched down near Harriston, damaging trees and a barn, and four EF0 tornadoes were also confirmed in Goderich, Vaughan, Kuhryville, and the last just southwest of Monkton.  
September 8 - two EF0 waterspouts were confirmed over Lake Ontario near Kingston, and over Georgian Bay, in the Parry Sound area.
September 10 - two concurrent waterspouts were confirmed over Georgian Bay, near Lafontaine Beach, and another was confirmed over Lake Huron at Goderich, Ontario. All three were given an EF0 rating.
September 12 - an EF1 tornado was confirmed near Parkhill, Ontario, causing tree and structural damage.
October 10 - an EF2 tornado was confirmed near Dryden, Ontario, causing tree damage. An EF1 was also confirmed near Mountain Lake (Ontario).
October 16 - two late season tornadoes were confirmed in southern Quebec. The first, an EF0, touched down near Sainte-Seraphine, causing tree and structural damage. The second, also an EF0, happened near Cowansville, also causing tree and structural damage. No injuries were reported.
October 17 - an EF0 waterspout was confirmed over Lake Huron, west of Goderich, Ontario.
November 6 - a rare, EF0 supercell tornado formed over the Strait of Georgia, west of Vancouver, British Columbia. Beginning as a waterspout, it came ashore and caused significant tree damage at the golf club on the University of British Columbia campus. Heavy rain and hail also accompanied the storm. No injuries were reported.
November 13 - an EF0 waterspout was confirmed over Lake Erie, south of Port Burwell, Ontario.
November 21 - an EF0 tornado was confirmed near Sharon, Ontario, northeast of Newmarket, damaging trees.

2022

May 15 - an EF0 landspout tornado was confirmed south of Casselman, Ontario, southeast of Ottawa, causing no damage.
May 21 - four tornadoes were confirmed across Ontario after a powerful derecho swept across the province. Two EF1 tornadoes touched down in London on the leading edge of the storm, damaging buildings, snapping trees and flipping a plane at the London International Airport. An EF2 was also confirmed in Uxbridge, northwest of Oshawa, causing extensive damage along a  path. A second EF2 tornado was confirmed in St. Christopher in the Township of Scugog, northeast of Oshawa, damaging barns and rural properties along an  path.
A second EF2 was confirmed at Kaoskauta Lake, southwest of Dryden, and three EF1's touched down near Crozier, Black Narrows and Harnett Lake, causing mostly tree damage.
May 31 - two tornadoes were confirmed in Northern Ontario, thanks to satellite imagery. An EF2 touched down near Attawapiskat Lake, east of Lansdowne House, in Neskantaga First Nation, and an EF1 was confirmed south of Webequie, near Becker Lake, on Webequie First Nation.
June 6 - an EF1 tornado touched down near Enchant, Alberta, damaging grain bins and a shed. No injuries were reported.
No damage was reported.
June 16 - two EF0 tornadoes were confirmed in Ontario, after severe storms swept across the province. The first touched down near Brooklin, north of Whitby, causing tree damage and destroying a small wooden structure. The second touched down near Carleton Place, causing no damage.
June 16 - six tornadoes were confirmed in Quebec from supercell thunderstorms. Two EF2 tornadoes touched down near Lac Johnson and Lac Betty, while 4 EF1 tornadoes were confirmed near Lac aux Eaux Mortes, McCarthy, Casey, and Lac Usik.
No damage was reported.
No damage was reported.
June 25 - an EF0 waterspout was confirmed on Lake St. Martin in Manitoba.
June 29 - an EF0 tornado was confirmed in an open field south of Coronation, Alberta, causing no damage.
June 29 - seven tornadoes were confirmed in Saskatchewan, including an EF2, which touched down west of Manitou Beach, causing tree damage. An EF1 was also confirmed west of Foam Lake, damaging farm equipment and grain bins. Two EF1 tornadoes on separate tracks touched down near Cymric, also damaging farm properties and grain bins. Two twin tornadoes were also confirmed southwest of Serath, damaging two farms and crops. They were given EF1 and EF0 ratings, respectively. An EF0 tornado was also confirmed near Arbury, Saskatchewan, causing crop damage.
June 29 - an EF2 tornado touched down in Duck Mountain Provincial Park, south of Kenville, Manitoba.

July 5 - three EF0 tornadoes were confirmed in Central Alberta, near Alliance, Consort, and Neutral Hills. No damage was reported.
July 5 - two EF0 tornadoes were confirmed in Saskatchewan, near Madison, and Smiley, northwest of Swift Current.
July 8 - four tornadoes were confirmed in central Saskatchewan, including 2 with an EF2 rating. They touched down in Paynton and Blaine Lake, causing damage to trees and a farm. Two EF0 tornadoes also hit near Lambert Lake and Oliver Lake, causing no damage.
July 9 - an EF0 tornado was confirmed near Argyle, Manitoba, causing no damage.
July 10 - an EF0 waterspout was confirmed over the English River, on the One Man Lake Reserve (Wabaseemoong Independent Nations), thanks to witness video. No damage was reported.
July 15 - three EF0 tornadoes were confirmed in Saskatchewan, near Allan, Young and Avonhusrt, causing crop and tree damage.
July 18 - an EF2 tornado touched down just west of Medicine Hat, Alberta, damaging at least 10 homes, grain bins, downing powerlines, and snapping trees.
July 18 - an EF2 tornado touched down northeast of Timmins, Ontario, near Gowanmarsh Lake.
July 19 - an EF0 tornado was confirmed in Wyoming, Ontario, damaging a machine shed.
July 20 - an EF2 tornado was confirmed north of Sudbury, Ontario in a heavily wooded area.
July 20 - ten tornadoes were confirmed in heavily forested areas of western Quebec, thanks to satellite imagery. Four EF2 tornadoes were confirmed near Lac Plantin, Lac Pedro, La Vallée-de-l'Or and Lac Antiquois. Six EF1 tornadoes additionally touched down near Lac des Deux Iles, near Lac Landerneau, Lac Stone Island, Lac Langford, Lac Tona and Lac Cade.
July 21 - four EF1 tornadoes touched down in rural parts of Quebec, near Saint-André-du-Lac-Saint-Jean, Lac Maher, Lac-Saint-Joseph and Lac des Ventres Rouges. No injuries were reported.
July 21 - an EF2 tornado was confirmed in a wooded area near Wild Goose Lake, New Brunswick, thanks to satellite imaginary. 
July 23 - an EF2 tornado touched down in the municipality of Saint-Adolphe-d'Howard, Quebec, in the Laurentians, damaging homes and uprooting trees. Two satellite tornadoes were also confirmed, which affected areas adjacent to the main tornadic flow. An EF0 was confirmed near Chemin du Village, and an EF1 touched down west of Saint-Joseph Lake.
July 24 - an EF2 tornado left a  path of damage through central Ontario, hitting the communities of Havelock, Marmora, Madoc, Actinolite and Tweed. It destroyed homes, barns and cottages, uprooted trees and downed power lines. At least one person was injured when their truck was lifted, and thrown into a field.  A weak, EF1 tornado was also confirmed southwest of Parham from the same parent storm, causing minor damage.
July 25 - an EF0 waterspout was confirmed over Lake Athabasca in northern Saskatchewan, causing no damage.
July 28 - an EF1 tornado was confirmed in Algonquin Park, leaving a  path through a forested area near Wapiti Lake.
August 1 - an EF0 waterspout was confirmed over Lake Erie, thanks to witness photos taken from Highland Glen, Ontario.
August 1 - an EF0 tornado was confirmed near Cranbrook, Ontario, causing a narrow path of damage to trees and crops.
August 2/3 - seven tornadoes were confirmed in the late evening and overnight hours in Northwestern Ontario, with six developing after a bow echo storm overtook a weak supercell near Grassy Narrows. Three EF2 tornadoes and four EF1 tornadoes were confirmed near Campfire Lake, Conifer Lake, Sumach Lake, Overnight Lake and Virginian Lake. All tornadoes occurred in forested areas.
August 3 - an EF0 tornado was confirmed in Shallow Lake, Ontario, northwest of Owen Sound, causing no damage.
No serious injuries were reported.
August 11 - an EF0 tornado was confirmed thanks to witness video in Saint-Elzéar-de-Témiscouata, Quebec, causing no damage.
August 18 - an EF0 tornado touched down east of Beausejour, Manitoba, and witness photos helped to confirm another EF0 tornado over Lake Manitoba. No damage was reported in either event.
August 20 - a review of satellite imagery revealed three tornadoes touched down in Northern Ontario; an EF1 near Iroquois Falls, in a forested area, and an EF1 and EF2 near Gooseberry Lake.
August 22 - an EF0 waterspout was confirmed over Lake Erie thanks to witness photos.
August 25 - a weak EF0 tornado was confirmed near Darbyville, Ontario, east of Guelph, causing no damage.
August 30 - an EF0 tornado touched down in Hastings, Ontario, causing tree damage.
August 31 - an EF0 waterspout formed over Lake Huron, and then made landfall through Sauble Beach, Ontario, damaging trees, boats and docks along a narrow  path.
August 31 - an EF0 tornado touched down in Stapledon, Ontario, southwest of Ottawa causing tree damage.
August 31 - an weak EF0 tornado was confirmed near Chicoutimi, Quebec, causing no damage.
September 13 - an EF0 tornado was confirmed over Lake Erie, near Port Glaskow, Ontario, thanks to witness video.
September 20 - four tornadoes were confirmed in Northwestern Ontario. An EF2 tornado was confirmed thanks to satellite imagery, southeast of Pickle Lake, in a heavily wooded area, leaving a  path. A second EF2 was also confirmed near Dusey Lake, southwest of Ogoki, and two EF1 tornadoes touched down near Winslow Lake and Calladine Lake, all causing tree damage in forested areas.
September 26 - Five tornadoes were confirmed near the shores of Lake Ontario and Lake Erie as part of a Great Lakes-wide waterspout outbreak. All were rated EF0-default, and occurred near Fort Erie, Port Colborne, Crystal Beach, Wellington and Grafton. Damage was reported in Wellington, where two trailers were flipped over.

See also

 List of Canadian tornadoes and tornado outbreaks
 List of tornadoes by province (Canada)
 List of F5 and EF5 tornadoes
 List of F4 and EF4 tornadoes
 List of F4 and EF4 tornadoes (2010–2019)
 List of F4 and EF4 tornadoes (2020–present)

References

Lists of 21st-century disasters
Canada
Lists of disasters in Canada
21st century in Canada